The Buffalo Hunters' War, or the Staked Plains War, occurred in 1877. Approximately 170 Comanche warriors and their families led by Quohadi chief Black Horse or Tu-ukumah (unknown–ca. 1900) left the Indian Territory in December, 1876, for the Llano Estacado of Texas. In February, 1877, they, and their Apache allies, began attacking buffalo hunters' camps in the Red River country of the Texas Panhandle, killing or wounding several. They also stole horses from the camp of Pat Garrett.

Forty-five hunters, led by Hank Campbell, Jim Smith, and Joe Freed, and guided by Jose Tafoya, left Rath City, a trading post on the Double Mountain Fork Brazos River. Smoky Hill Thompson remained behind to lead the defense of the trading post.

The party trailed the natives to their camp in Thompson's Canyon, now known as Yellow House Canyon in present-day Lubbock, Texas, where they attacked on March 18. The hunters were repulsed and the natives escaped, including white captive Herman Lehmann, who was wounded in the battle.

The hunters' casualties were four wounded and one later dying from wounds. It was later reported by the military that the natives suffered 35 dead and 22 wounded.

See also
 Buffalo Soldier tragedy of 1877

References
 Dictionary of American History by James Truslow Adams, New York: Charles Scribner's Sons, 1940
 The Border and the Buffalo by John R. Cook, 1907, Citadel Press (1967)
 
 
 In 1877, Mackenzie Park was site of a deadly battle. Lubbock Online, Nov. 27, 2007

Conflicts in 1877
Comanche campaign
Texas–Indian Wars
Wars involving the indigenous peoples of North America
Battles involving the Comanche
Bison hunting
1877 in the United States
Apache Wars